Anadia bumanguesa is a species of lizard in the family Gymnophthalmidae. It is endemic to Colombia.

References

Anadia (genus)
Reptiles of Colombia
Endemic fauna of Colombia
Reptiles described in 2004
Taxa named by José Vicente Rueda Almonacid
Taxa named by José Rances Caicedo Portilla